This is a list of the Australian moth species of the family Psychidae. It also acts as an index to the species articles and forms part of the full List of moths of Australia.

Archaeoneura amictopis (Turner, 1923)
Ardiosteres dryophracta Meyrick, 1917
Ardiosteres eumelana Turner, 1917
Ardiosteres lacerata Meyrick, 1917
Ardiosteres moretonella (Walker, 1866)
Ardiosteres pectinata Meyrick, 1917
Ardiosteres sporocosma Turner, 1917
Ardiosteres tetrazona Meyrick, 1920
Ardiosteres tortricitella (Walker, 1866)
Ardiosteres trifasciana (Walker, 1863)
Ardiosteres velutinana (Walker, 1863)
Bathromelas hyaloscopa (Meyrick & Lower, 1907)
Cebysa leucotelus Walker, 1854
Clania ignobilis (Walker, 1869)
Clania lewinii (Westwood, 1855)
Colpotorna lasiopa Meyrick, 1920
Conoeca guildingi Scott, 1864
Dappula tertius (Templeton, 1847)
Elinostola agriodes Meyrick, 1921
Elinostola hyalina Turner, 1947
Elinostola hypomela Meyrick & Lower, 1907
Elinostola panagria Meyrick, 1921
Gyrophylla eumetra Turner, 1935
Hyalarcta huebneri (Westwood, 1855)
Hyalarcta nigrescens (Doubleday, 1845)
Hyaloptila melanosoma Turner, 1947
Iphierga chrysopa Turner, 1917
Iphierga chrysophaes Turner, 1917
Iphierga crypsilopha Lower, 1903
Iphierga dispersa Meyrick, 1917
Iphierga euphragma Meyrick, 1893
Iphierga lysiphracta Meyrick, 1917
Iphierga macarista Turner, 1917
Iphierga magnifica (Meyrick, 1893)
Iphierga melichrysa Lower, 1902
Iphierga pentulias Meyrick, 1893
Iphierga polyzona Lower, 1903
Iphierga stasiodes Meyrick, 1893
Lepidoscia acropolia (Turner, 1923)
Lepidoscia adelopis (Meyrick, 1893)
Lepidoscia amphiscia Meyrick, 1893
Lepidoscia annosella (Walker, 1869)
Lepidoscia apochroa (Meyrick, 1893)
Lepidoscia arctiella (Walker, 1860)
Lepidoscia arctodes (Meyrick, 1920)
Lepidoscia bancrofti (T.P. Lucas, 1890)
Lepidoscia barysema Lower, 1903
Lepidoscia basiferana (Walker, 1863)
Lepidoscia callista (Lower, 1903)
Lepidoscia campylota (Lower, 1903)
Lepidoscia carlotta (Meyrick, 1893)
Lepidoscia cataphracta (Meyrick, 1893)
Lepidoscia characota (Meyrick, 1893)
Lepidoscia charitodes (Meyrick, 1893)
Lepidoscia chloropetala Meyrick, 1893
Lepidoscia chrysastra Turner, 1923
Lepidoscia chrysopetala (Meyrick, 1893)
Lepidoscia chrysura (Meyrick, 1893)
Lepidoscia cirrhosticha (Turner, 1923)
Lepidoscia commatica (Turner, 1933)
Lepidoscia comochroa Meyrick, 1893
Lepidoscia confluens (Turner, 1939)
Lepidoscia conioptila (Turner, 1923)
Lepidoscia crepuscularis (Meyrick, 1893)
Lepidoscia desmophthora Meyrick, 1893
Lepidoscia dicranota (Turner, 1923)
Lepidoscia educta (Meyrick, 1920)
Lepidoscia epichrysa (Lower, 1903)
Lepidoscia epitricha (Lower, 1903)
Lepidoscia euctena (Turner, 1927)
Lepidoscia euryptera (Meyrick, 1893)
Lepidoscia eurystola Lower, 1903
Lepidoscia euscia (Lower, 1903)
Lepidoscia euthrygramma (Turner, 1923)
Lepidoscia gastromela (Lower, 1903)
Lepidoscia glabrella (Walker, 1863)
Lepidoscia hamalitha (Meyrick, 1893)
Lepidoscia heliochares (Meyrick, 1893)
Lepidoscia heliozona (Meyrick, 1893)
Lepidoscia hemicalyptra (Lower, 1903)
Lepidoscia herbicola Meyrick, 1921
Lepidoscia holozona (Lower, 1903)
Lepidoscia hyalistis (Lower, 1903)
Lepidoscia irrorea (R. Felder & Rogenhofer, 1875)
Lepidoscia ischnomorpha (Turner, 1923)
Lepidoscia lainodes Meyrick, 1921
Lepidoscia lasiocola (Meyrick, 1893)
Lepidoscia lasiomicra (Lower, 1903)
Lepidoscia lechriotypa (Turner, 1923)
Lepidoscia lenceres (Turner, 1900)
Lepidoscia leucochroa (Turner, 1923)
Lepidoscia ligatus (Walker, 1865)
Lepidoscia lignatrix (Meyrick, 1921)
Lepidoscia maculifera (Lower, 1916)
Lepidoscia magnella (Walker, 1863)
Lepidoscia melanarthra (Meyrick, 1893)
Lepidoscia melanogramma Lower, 1903
Lepidoscia melanospora (Turner, 1923)
Lepidoscia melitora Meyrick, 1893
Lepidoscia microsticha Meyrick, 1893
Lepidoscia microzona (Lower, 1903)
Lepidoscia monosticha Turner, 1923
Lepidoscia monozona (Meyrick, 1893)
Lepidoscia muricolor Turner, 1939
Lepidoscia myriospila (Turner, 1923)
Lepidoscia nemorivaga (Turner, 1916)
Lepidoscia nephelodes (Meyrick, 1893)
Lepidoscia niphospila (Turner, 1923)
Lepidoscia palleuca Meyrick, 1893
Lepidoscia pelochroa (Meyrick, 1893)
Lepidoscia phaeostola (Turner, 1923)
Lepidoscia phaulodes (Meyrick, 1893)
Lepidoscia photidias (Lower, 1903)
Lepidoscia placoxantha Lower, 1903
Lepidoscia polychrysa Lower, 1903
Lepidoscia polymeres (Turner, 1900)
Lepidoscia polystona (Turner, 1914)
Lepidoscia protorna (Meyrick, 1893)
Lepidoscia punctiferella (Walker, 1863)
Lepidoscia pygmaea (Meyrick, 1893)
Lepidoscia raricoma Meyrick, 1893
Lepidoscia reticulata (Meyrick, 1893)
Lepidoscia retinochra (Lower, 1903)
Lepidoscia saxosa (Meyrick, 1893)
Lepidoscia sciodesma Meyrick, 1893
Lepidoscia scotinopis (Meyrick, 1897)
Lepidoscia semiota (Lower, 1903)
Lepidoscia sinuosa (Turner, 1923)
Lepidoscia sparsa (Meyrick, 1921)
Lepidoscia stellaris (Meyrick, 1893)
Lepidoscia stenomochla (Turner, 1926)
Lepidoscia stictoptera (Lower, 1920)
Lepidoscia strepsidoma (Meyrick, 1920)
Lepidoscia strigulata Meyrick, 1893
Lepidoscia tetramochla (Turner, 1923)
Lepidoscia tetraphragma Meyrick, 1921
Lepidoscia toxoteuches (Turner, 1927)
Lepidoscia trileuca Lower, 1903
Lepidoscia trizona (Lower, 1903)
Lepidoscia tyrobathra Meyrick, 1893
Lepidoscia zonarcha (Meyrick, 1893)
Lomera boisduvalii (Westwood, 1855)
Metura elongatus (Saunders, 1847)
Metura oceanica Viette, 1963
Napecoetes belogramma (Turner, 1916)
Napecoetes chrysomitra (Turner, 1933)
Napecoetes crossospila Turner, 1913
Napecoetes scoteina (Turner, 1900)
Oecobia frauenfeldi Scott, 1864
Paracharactis cautopsis Meyrick & Lower, 1907
Paracharactis delocephala Meyrick & Lower, 1907
Paracharactis erionota (Lower, 1901)
Paracharactis leeuweni (Heylaerts, 1885)
Phasmyalea pellucida Turner, 1947
Piestoceros conjunctella (Walker, 1863)
Plutorectella abdominalis (Strand, 1924)
Psychanisa baliodes (Meyrick, 1893)
Psychanisa guttata Walker, 1855
Sentica felderi (Scott, 1864)
Sentica oppositella Walker, 1863
Trigonocyttara clandestina Turner, 1945

The following species belongs to the family Psychidae, but have not been assigned to a genus yet. Given here is the original name given to the species when it was first described:
Oiketicus aristocosma Lower, 1908
Oeceticus bicolor T.P. Lucas, 1894
Plutorectis caespitosae Oke, 1948
Plutorectis capnaea Turner, 1947
Plutorectis crocobathra Turner, 1947
Oiketicus dewitzi Heylaerts, 1885
Plutorectis dysmorpha Turner, 1947
Oeceticus felinus T.P. Lucas, 1900
Plutorectis fulva Turner, 1947
Chalia grisea Heylaerts, 1885
Oiketecis gymnophasa Lower, 1900
Clania hemitricha Meyrick & Lower, 1907
Hyaloptila hyalosoma Turner, 1947
Chalia lurida Heylaerts, 1885
Plutorectis melanodes Meyrick & Lower, 1907
Plutorectis mjobergi Aurivillius, 1920
Mesopherna niphopasta Turner, 1923
Plutorectis pantosemna Turner, 1931
Plutorectis paura Turner, 1947
Plutorectis pelloceros Turner, 1932
Clania persimilis Turner, 1947
Clania photidias Meyrick & Lower, 1907
Clania sciogramma Turner, 1914
Plutorectis thermacula Lower, 1908
Oiketicus walkeriana Betrem, 1951
Plutorectis xanthochrysa Meyrick & Lower, 1907
Plutorectis zophopepla Meyrick & Lower, 1907

External links 
Psychidae at Australian Faunal Directory

Australia